The 1982–83 Boston University Terriers men's basketball team represented Boston University during the 1982–83 NCAA Division I men's basketball season. The Terriers, led by fifth year head coach Rick Pitino, played their home games at Case Gym and were members of the East Coast Athletic Conference. They finished the season 21–10, 8–2 in ECAC North play to finish in a tie for the regular season conference title. The Terriers won the ECAC North tournament to receive an automatic bid to the NCAA tournament as one of two No. 12 seeds in the East region. Boston University was defeated by La Salle in the play-in round, 70–58.

Roster

Schedule and results

|-
!colspan=9 style=| Regular season

|-
!colspan=9 style=| ECAC North tournament

|-
!colspan=9 style=| NCAA tournament

References

Boston University Terriers men's basketball seasons
Boston University
Boston University
Boston University Terriers men's basketball team
Boston University Terriers men's basketball team